Sporting Club Albigeois is a professional French rugby union club playing the third-level Nationale. During the past years it went back and forth between Top 14, the highest level of the French league system and the second-level Rugby Pro D2. Their last time in the Top 14 was for 2009–10 after winning the 2008–09 promotion playoffs. The previous one began in 2006 and came to an end after the 2007–08 season due to financial issues. Founded in 1907, the club plays at the Stadium municipal d'Albi (capacity 12,000). They wear black and yellow. They are based in Albi in Occitanie.

History
Sporting Club Albigeois was founded in December 1906 as a sportsclub where, in addition to rugby, tennis and running were practiced. Their first title came in 1926 when they beat Stade Toulousain in the final of the highly competitive championnat des Pyrénées (Pyrénées league).

In 1940, the Vichy regime forced towns with a population below 50,000 to merge their sports clubs in single entities. (UA Gaillac is another rugby union example). Vichy also targeted the professional rugby league and Albi was forced to bring together the two local clubs, S.C. Albi and R.C. Albi XIII under the name Albi Olympique.

In 1945, each club went its way and recovered its previous name. In 1949, SC Albi reached the First Division. In 1955, it qualified for the playoffs, managing to oust the prestigious Racing Club de France in the first round, before going down to Romans in the round of 16.

Until the 1980s, Albi went through regular ups-and-downs between the first and second divisions (Div 1 1961–1970, 1973–75, 1977–79, Div 2, 1957 – 1959, 1970–73, 1975–77, 1979–85). Their only notable performance was another playoff win against Toulouse in 1974. Albi remained in the second or third divisions until 2000.

The millennium was very favourable for Albi. The club reached three consecutive third division finals, all lost, in 2000, 2001 et 2002, to FC Oloron Sainte-Marie, Oyonnax and Tours. However, the professional Pro D2 offered two promotion spots in 2002 and Albi was back in the second division.

It took them four more years to take the last step. After finishing second to US Montauban in the 2006 regular season, they went on to beat AS Béziers and US Dax in the promotion playoffs and secure the final spot in the élite league Top 14. They remained in Top 14 until the 2007–08 season. Although they finished 12th that season, which would normally have kept them in the top flight, they were forcibly relegated to Pro D2 due to financial issues.

The following season, they finished third on the regular-season table, qualifying for the promotion playoffs. Their home playoff semifinal against La Rochelle ended 12–12 in regulation. Each team slotted a penalty in extra time, which ended 15–15. Under French rules, the first tiebreaker in such a situation is fewest red cards. Since neither side had a player sent off, the next tiebreaker is number of tries, followed by number of penalties scored. Albi went through because they had kicked 5 penalties to La Rochelle's 4 (and one drop goal). They defeated Oyonnax 14–12 in the playoff final on 31 May 2009 in Montpellier to secure their place in the  Top 14 2009–2010 season.

By April 2010 the club had already been relegated from the Top 14 after recording only 3 wins all season.

Honours
 French league, Division 1: (predecessor to today's Top 14)
Round of 16 : 1955, 1974
 Rugby Pro D2:
 Promotion playoff winners: 2006, 2009
 French League, Division 1, B Group: (second division; predecessor to today's Pro D2)
semi-final: 1980, 1986
 French league, Nationale 1: (Div 3, highest amateur level)
Runner-up: 2000
French league, Promotion Nationale: (Div 3, highest amateur level)
Runner-up: 2001
 French league, Fédérale 1: (Div 3, highest amateur level)
Runner-up: 2002
 Championnat des Pyrénées:
Winner 1926

Current standings

Current squad

The current Albi squad is:

Notable former players

  Robert Basauri
  René Bousquet. 9 caps. One of the 15 Frenchmen who defeated England for the first time in 1927.
  Pierre Danos
  Charles-Antoine Gonnet. 16 cap. Also beat the English in 1927.
  Bernard Momméjat. 9 caps with SCA.

French president Georges Pompidou accepted to be honorary chairman of the club in 1969 and paid his fees regularly  until he died in 1974. .

See also
 List of rugby union clubs in France
 Rugby union in France

References

External links
  SC Albi Official website
  Club volunteers’ website

Albi
Rugby clubs established in 1906
Midi-Pyrénées
Occitania (administrative region)
Sport in Albi
1906 establishments in France